Fri is the capital of the Greek island of Kasos in the Dodecanese. As of 2001, its population was 357.

Geography

Fri is located in the northern coast of Kasos. The settlement is built around the Mpouka bay. East of Fri is Mpouka and 500 meters from Fri is the old harbour, Emporeios.

Modern Fri

Fri was built in 1840 from inhabitants of Aghia Marina and refugees of the Kasos Massacre. The name was probably given due to the shape of the shoreline which resembles an eyebrow. Coincidentally, the modern Turkish for eyebrow is 'kas'.  The municipality of Kasos is located in Fri as well as a local clinic and the archeological museum. Today, Fri has a small sports center and a public library. There is also an elementary school. From 2010 the meteorological station of the National Observatory of Athens is located in the Municipality of Kasos in Fri. The port of Fri is connected with Piraeus, Crete, Karpathos and Rhodes. Most of the houses in Fri have two floors and feature a traditional architecture.  These houses are found in Fri the last 150 years along with old churches and monasteries.

Climate
Fri has a dry and mild climate throughout the year, with the most rain falling during autumn and winter. According to the data of the National Observatory of Athens station, Fri has a hot semi-arid climate and records the mildest winters in Greece, with a record low temperature of 2.7 °C.

References

Dodecanese
Municipalities of the South Aegean
Populated places in Karpathos (regional unit)